Mihnea III Radu (1613 – 5 April 1660), was a Prince of Moldavia, and ruler of Wallachia from March 1658 to November 1659. His father was alleged to have been the Voivode Radu Mihnea.

Family

Ancestry claims
Radu's ancestry is uncertain. In his day, Radu claimed to be the son of Radu Mihnea, but other versions of his history give different accounts of his ancestry, such as claiming his true father was Radu Șerban or Mircea Ciobanu. Pârvu Cantacuzino claims that "Mihnea was  originally a Greek money-lender. His father was called  Iane the Deaf (Rom.  “Surdul”), and he himself  was baptized Franți. Thus, showing from a young age a propensity to follow Ishmael, Hagar’s son, he ran away from his parents, went to Țarigrad, and bowed in allegiance to Kinan-pașa, telling him that he was the son of Radu-voivode and the grand-son of Mihnea-voivode. And thus he spent his life with the Turks, around 40 years".

However, the lack of contemporary evidence makes it hard to pinpoint his true ancestry.

Descendants
He had one son, Martin, who served as a general in the army of George Ducas.

Biography

Early life 
According to a Turkish traveller, Mihnea was raised in the Greek community of Istanbul. He was a good friend of Grand Vizier Kenan Pasha and his wife, and his status was reportedly comparable to that of an adopted son.

Rise to power 

In July 1653, Mihnea was probably behind an assassination attempt on Matei Basarab's life.

On 29 January 1658, Mihnea swore allegiance to Ottoman Sultan Mehmed IV.

A little over a month later, Ottoman troops invaded Wallachia and overthrew then-voivode Constantin Șerban, installing the more compliant Radu in his place on 5 March 1658.

Death 
Mihnea most likely died on April 5, 1660, the day after attending a banquet in Sătmar hosted by Constantin Șerban.

References

Bibliography 
 
 
 
 
 

Rulers of Wallachia
1613 births
1660 deaths